SONOIO is a solo project of Italian musician Alessandro Cortini, best known as the keyboardist for Nine Inch Nails' touring lineup and as a member of Modwheelmood. The name of the alternative rock/electronic project comes from the Italian phrase "sono io", which means "it's me".

Career
On July 28, 2010, SONOIO released four tracks for free from its upcoming album. The first album, Blue, was released in its entirety on September 14, 2010. Blue is a nine-track album created entirely on Buchla modular synths, and is available from iTunes, Amazon, and in various packages direct from the project's website. One fan package included an electronic synthesizer called the SuONOIO (Italian for "I make sound"), which contains samples and sound sources used in the album. This allowed fans to experiment with various effects and sounds from the album. On December 23, 2010, SONOIO released a free nine-track remix album entitled NON SONOIO. There was no physical release of NON SONOIO, and it was released digitally for download. The album consists of reinterpretations of Blue tracks by Ladytron, Big Black Delta, Richard Devine, and others.

On May 30, 2011, SONOIO released four free tracks from its second album, Red. The album was released on June 21, 2011. It is a nine-track album which is available for purchase from iTunes, Amazon, and in various packages direct from the project's website. On 20 September 2011, on the SONOIO Facebook page, it was indicated that a remix album for Red was in production. This was made available as NON (Red) on 21 December, with a high-definition download offered for a small fee alongside free MP3 files of the album.

On July 12, 2013, it was announced via Twitter that a new SONOIO record was in the works and that there would be "new music before the end of the year", but this did not happen. On September 15, 2014, a new video was posted by Cortini's YouTube account for a song called "Thanks for Calling". Cortini released his third and final album as SONOIO, Fine, in July 2018.

Touring
In autumn 2011, SONOIO opened for Ladytron on the latter's Gravity the Seducer headline tour of North America.

Discography

Studio albums
Blue (2010)
Red (2011)
Fine (2018)

Remix albums
NON (Blue) (2010)
NON (Red) (2011)

References

External links
SONOIO Official website
SONOIO page on Myspace
Videos hosted on Vimeo
Profile on Facebook

Electronic music groups from California
Musical groups from Los Angeles
American electronic musicians